Nwosu Pita Nwana (1881 — 1968) was a Nigerian novelist and carpenter. He mostly known as the writer of the first Igbo novel Omenuko. Nwana's Omenuko is regarded as the bedrock for fiction in Igbo literature.

Life and career 
Nwana was born in 1881. He was the youngest child in a family of seven. He worked as a at Methodist College Uzuakoli and later as an interpreter for Rev. J. Wood at then Ibo Institute.  In 1933, he wrote Omenuko which won a prize in a competition run by the International African Institute, and was later published by Longman in 1935.

References

Igbo novelists